Saint Theodora may refer to:

 Theodora (6th century) (500–548), 6th century Byzantine (Eastern Roman) empress, wife of Justinian I, considered a saint by the Greek Orthodox Church
 Theodora (wife of Theophilos) (born 815), Byzantine (Eastern Roman) empress in the 9th century
 Theodora (Roman martyr) (died 120), 2nd-century Christian martyr and saint
 Theodora and Didymus (died 304), early Christian martyrs
 Theodora of Alexandria, Eastern Orthodox saint
 Theodora (10th century), servant of Basil the Younger
 Theodora of Arta (са. 1225 - after 1270) 13th century, Empress of Epirus
 Theodora of Sihla (1650–?), Romanian Christian Orthodox saint
 Théodore Guérin (1798–1856), French-American saint, founder of the Sisters of Providence of Saint Mary-of-the-Woods, Indiana

See also 
 Saint Theodore (disambiguation)
 Theodora (disambiguation)